Charles Westerholm (December 27, 1897 – September 2, 1977) was an American cyclist. He competed in the individual road race at the 1928 Summer Olympics.

References

External links
 

1897 births
1977 deaths
American male cyclists
Olympic cyclists of the United States
Cyclists at the 1928 Summer Olympics
Sportspeople from Uusimaa